The 1968 Islip 300 was a NASCAR Grand National Series event that was held on July 7, 1968, at Islip Speedway in Islip, New York.

The transition to purpose-built racecars began in the early 1960s and occurred gradually over that decade.  Changes made to the sport by the late 1960s brought an end to the "strictly stock" vehicles of the 1950s.

Background
Islip Speedway was a .2-mile (320-meter) oval race track in Islip, New York which was open from 1947 until 1984. It is the smallest track ever to host NASCAR's Grand National Series, from 1964 to 1971. The first demolition derby took place at Islip Speedway in 1958. The idea was patented by Larry Mendelson, who worked at Islip Speedway.

Race report
The race's advertised distance was 300 laps on a paved track spanning . It took fifty-five minutes and seventeen seconds in order to complete the entire race. Starting at 8:15 PM, the race was quickly over before 9:15 PM. The race was attended by 4,600 spectators and they witnessed one caution for three laps. General admission for this event was only $4 plus sales taxes ($ when adjusted for inflation) while children got in for only $1 with an adult general admission ($ when adjusted for inflation).

The most notable crew chiefs to participate in this event were Ray Hicks, Eddie Allison, Jake Elder, Frankie Scott, Dale Inman and Harry Hyde.

Bobby Allison managed to defeat David Pearson by six car lengths. The track was shorter than even Martinsville Speedway; giving it the notoriety of being lapped by the leaders during the first ten four laps of a race. Start and park racing was a way to avoid demoralization in those circumstances as opposed to maintaining a profit margin. Most of the drivers drove the latest model of stock car automobiles to this race. Buddy Baker would perform in a 1968 Dodge Charger while Richard Petty raced around the track in a 1968 Plymouth GTX. Three years later, the uncertain economic climate of the early 1970s would necessitate start and park racing in order for lesser teams to remain as viable as possible.

Bobby Allison would receive $1,000 ($ when adjusted for inflation) for winning the race while Gene Black would receive $100 ($ when adjusted for inflation) for finishing in last place. Four different car manufacturers led the race and four different finished in the top four.

The total winnings for this race was $5,255 ($ when adjusted for inflation). John Winger would make his NASCAR debut during this racing event.

Qualifying

Failed to qualify:  Bob Cooper (#02), Dick Johnson (#18), Henley Gray (#19), Stan Meserve (#51), Bobby Mausgrover (#88)

Finishing order
Section reference:

 Bobby Allison (No. 2)
 David Pearson† (No. 17)
 Buddy Baker† (No. 3)
 Richard Petty (No. 43)
 James Hylton (No. 48)
 Bobby Isaac† (No. 71)
 Elmo Langley† (No. 64)
 Clyde Lynn† (No. 20)
 John Sears† (No. 4)
 Neil Castles (No. 06)
 Wendell Scott† (No. 34)
 John Winger (No. 44)
 Jabe Thomas (No. 25)
 Buck Baker† (No. 87)
 Ed Negre*† (No. 8)
 Bill Vanderhoff* (No. 09)
 Earl Brooks*† (No. 28)
 Frank Warren* (No. 0)
 J.D. McDuffie*† (No. 70)
 G.C. Spencer*† (No. 49)
 Bill Seifert* (No. 45)
 Roy Tyner*† (No. 76)
 Paul Dean Holt* (No. 01)
 David Mote* (No. 69)
 Gene Black*† (No. 75)

† signifies that the driver is known to be deceased 
* Driver failed to finish race

Timeline
Section reference:
 Start of race: Buddy Baker started the race with the pole position.
 Lap 17: Gene Black's transmission became problematic, making him the last-place finisher.
 Lap 29: The shocks on David Mote's vehicle started acting up, forcing him to withdraw from the race.
 Lap 62: Paul Dean Holt quit the race for personal reasons.
 Lap 74: Oil pressure issues forced Roy Tyner into the sidelines for the remainder of the race.
 Lap 96: Richard Petty takes over the lead from Buddy Baker.
 Lap 109: Bill Seifert quit the race for personal reasons.
 Lap 110: G.C. Spencer lost the rear end of his vehicle, his day on the track was brought to a premature end.
 Lap 127: The vehicle of J.D. McDuffie developed brake problems, causing him to exit the event.
 Lap 160: Frank Warren's vehicle developed a faulty fuel pump, forcing him off the track.
 Lap 191: Earl Brooks quit the race for personal reasons.
 Lap 193: David Pearson takes over the lead from Richard Petty.
 Lap 230: Bill Vanderhoff's vehicle developed brake problems, forcing him out of the race.
 Lap 231: Ed Negre's vehicle lost its rear end, causing him to become the final DNF for this event.
 Lap 273: Bobby Allison takes over the lead from David Pearson.
 Finish: Bobby Allison was officially declared the winner of the event.

References

Islip 300
Islip 300
NASCAR races at Islip Speedway